Pakistan is a multilingual country with dozens of languages spoken as first languages. The majority of Pakistan's languages belong to the Indo-Iranian group of the Indo-European language family.

Urdu is the national language and the lingua franca of Pakistan, and while sharing official status with English, it is the preferred and dominant language used for inter-communication between different ethnic groups. Numerous regional languages are spoken as first languages by Pakistan's various ethnolinguistic groups. Languages with more than a million speakers each include Punjabi, Pashto, Sindhi, Saraiki, Urdu, Balochi, Hindko, Pahari-Pothwari and Brahui. There are approximately 60 local languages with less than a million speakers.

List of languages 
The 2022 edition of Ethnologue lists 77 established languages in Pakistan. Of these, 68 are indigenous and 9 are non-indigenous. In terms of their vitality, 4 are classified as 'institutional', 24 are 'developing', 30 are 'vigorous', 15 are 'in trouble', and 4 are 'dying'.

Statistics 

&ast; Saraiki was included with Punjabi in the 1951 and 1961 censuses.

Official languages

Urdu (National language) 

 Urdu is the national language and lingua franca of Pakistan. Although only about 7% of Pakistanis speak it as their first language, it is widely spoken and understood as a second language by the vast majority of Pakistanis.

No region in Pakistan uses Urdu as its mother tongue, though it is spoken as the first language of Muslim migrants (known as Muhajirs) in Pakistan who left India after independence in 1947. Urdu was chosen as a symbol of unity for the new state of Pakistan in 1947, because it had already served as a lingua franca among Muslims in north and northwest British India. It is written, spoken and used in all provinces/territories of Pakistan, and together with English as the main languages of instruction, although the people from differing provinces may have different native languages.

Urdu is taught as a compulsory subject up to higher secondary school in both English and Urdu medium school systems, which has produced millions of second-language Urdu speakers among people whose native language is one of the other languages of Pakistan – which in turn has led to the absorption of vocabulary from various regional Pakistani languages, while some Urdu vocabularies has also been assimilated by Pakistan's regional languages.

English (Co-official language) 

English is a co-official language of Pakistan and is widely used in the executive, legislative and judicial branches as well as to some extent in the officer ranks of Pakistan's armed forces. Pakistan's Constitution and laws were written in English and are now being re-written in the local languages. It is also widely used in schools, colleges and universities as a medium of instruction. English is seen as the language of upward mobility, and its use is becoming more prevalent in upper social circles, where it is often spoken alongside native Pakistani languages. In 2015, it was announced that there were plans to promote Urdu in official business, but Pakistan's Minister of Planning Ahsan Iqbal stated, "Urdu will be a second medium of language and all official business will be bilingual." He also went on to say that English would be taught alongside Urdu in schools.

Major languages

Punjabi 

Punjabi is an Indo-Aryan language primarily spoken in the Punjab province of Pakistan, with the prominent dialect being the Majha dialect, written in the Shahmukhi script. Punjabi is the most widely spoken language in Pakistan. It is spoken as a first language by 38.78% of Pakistanis. It is the 11th most widely spoken language in India, and the third most-spoken native language in the Indian Subcontinent. The language is spoken among a significant overseas diaspora, particularly in Canada, the United Kingdom, and the United States. Punjabi is unusual among the Indo-Aryan languages and the broader Indo-European language family in its usage of lexical tone.

Pashto 

Pashto is an Iranian language spoken as a first language by more than 18.24% of Pakistanis, mainly in Khyber Pakhtunkhwa and in northern Balochistan as well as in ethnic Pashtun communities in the cities of Islamabad, Rawalpindi, Lahore, and most notably Karachi, which may have the largest Pashtun population of any city in the world. There are three major dialect patterns within which the various individual dialects may be classified; these are Pakhto, which is the Northern (Peshawar) variety, and the softer Pashto spoken in the southern areas such as in Quetta.

Sindhi 

Sindhi is an Indo-Aryan language spoken as a first language by almost 15% of Pakistanis, mostly in the Sindh province of Pakistan. The name "Sindhi" is derived from Sindhu, the original name of the Indus River.

Like other languages of this family, Sindhi has passed through Old Indo-Aryan (Sanskrit) and Middle Indo-Aryan (Pali, secondary Prakrits, and Apabhramsha) stages of growth. 20th century Western scholars such as George Abraham Grierson believed that Sindhi descended specifically from the Vrācaḍa dialect of Apabhramsha (described by Markandeya as being spoken in Sindhu-deśa) but later work has shown this to be unlikely. It entered the New Indo-Aryan stage around the 10th century CE.

Saraiki 

Saraiki is an Indo-Aryan language of the Lahnda group, spoken in central and southeastern Pakistan, primarily in the southern part of the province of Punjab. Saraiki is to a high degree mutually intelligible with Standard Punjabi and shares with it a large portion of its vocabulary and morphology. At the same time in its phonology it is radically different (particularly in the lack of tones, the preservation of the voiced aspirates and the development of implosive consonants), and has important grammatical features in common with the Sindhi language spoken to the south.

Saraiki is the language of about 26 million people in Pakistan, ranging across southern Punjab, southern Khyber Pakhtunkhwa, and border regions of northern Sindh and eastern Balochistan.

Balochi 

Balochi is an Iranian language spoken as a first language by about 3% of Pakistanis, mostly in the Balochistan province. Rakshani is the major dialect group in terms of numbers. Sarhaddi is a sub-dialect of Rakshani. Other sub-dialects are Kalati (Qalati), Chagai-Kharani and Panjguri. Eastern Hill Balochi or Northern Balochi is very different from the rest.

Hindko 

Hindko is a cover term for a diverse group of Lahnda dialects spoken in several discontinuous areas in northwestern Pakistan, primarily in the provinces of Khyber Pakhtunkhwa and Punjab.
Hindko is mutually intelligible with Punjabi and Saraiki, and has more affinities with the latter than with the former. Differences with other Punjabi varieties are more pronounced in the morphology and phonology than in the syntax.
The word Hindko, commonly used to refer to a number of Indo-Aryan dialects spoken in the neighbourhood of Pashto, likely originally meant "the Indian language" (in contrast to Pashto). An alternative local name for this language group is Hindki.

Brahui 

Brahui is a Dravidian language spoken in the central part of Balochistan province. Brahui is spoken in the central part of Pakistani Balochistan, mainly in Kalat, Khuzdar and Mastung districts, but also in smaller numbers in neighboring districts, as well as in Afghanistan which borders Pakistani Balochistan; however, many members of the ethnic group no longer speak Brahui.

Endangered languages 

Other languages spoken by linguistic minorities include the languages listed below, with speakers ranging from a few hundred to tens of thousands. A few are highly endangered languages that may soon have no speakers at all. The United Nations Educational, Scientific and Cultural Organization defines five levels of language endangerment between "safe" (not endangered) and "extinct":

 Vulnerable - "most children speak the language, but it may be restricted to certain domains (e.g., home)"
 Definitely endangered – "children no longer learn the language as mother tongue in the home"
 Severely endangered – "language is spoken by grandparents and older generations; while the parent generation may understand it, they do not speak it to children or among themselves"
 Critically endangered – "the youngest speakers are grandparents and older, and they speak the language partially and infrequently"
 Extinct – "there are no speakers left; included in the Atlas if presumably extinct since the 1950s"

The list below includes the findings from the third edition of Atlas of the World's Languages in Danger (2010; formerly the Red Book of Endangered Languages), as well as the online edition of the aforementioned publication, both published by UNESCO.

Other languages

Arabic (religious and minor literary language) 
Arabic is the religious language of Muslims. The Quran, Sunnah, Hadith and Muslim theology is taught in Arabic with Urdu translation. Arabic is taught as a religious language in mosques, schools, colleges, universities and madrassahs. A majority of Pakistan's Muslim population has had some form of formal or informal education in the reading, writing and pronunciation of Arabic as part of their religious education.

Arabic is mentioned in the constitution of Pakistan. It declares in article 31 No. 2 that "The State shall endeavour, as respects the Muslims of Pakistan (a) to make the teaching of the Holy Quran and Islamiat compulsory, to encourage and facilitate the learning of Arabic language ..."

The National Education Policy 2017 declares in article 3.7.4 that: "Arabic as compulsory part will be integrated in Islamiyat from Middle to Higher Secondary level to enable the students to understand the Holy Quran." Furthermore, it specifies in article 3.7.6: "Arabic as elective subject shall be offered properly at Secondary and Higher Secondary level with Arabic literature and grammar in its course to enable the learners to have command in the language." This law is also valid for private schools as it defines in article 3.7.12: "The curriculum in Islamiyat, Arabic and Moral Education of public sector will be adopted by the private institutions to make uniformity in the society."

Persian (historical official and literary language) 

Persian was the official and cultural language of the Mughal Empire, a continuation since the introduction of the language by Central Asian Turkic invaders who migrated into the Indian Subcontinent, and the patronisation of it by the earlier Turko-Persian Delhi Sultanate. Persian was officially abolished with the arrival of the British: in Sindh in 1843 and in Punjab in 1849. It is today spoken primarily by the Dari speaking refugees from Afghanistan and a small number of local Balochistani Hazara community, whereas most Pakistani Hazaras speak Hazaragi, which is considered a separate language by some expert and a variety of Farsi language by others.

Bengali (previous regional and immigrant language) 

Bengali is not an official language in Pakistan, but a significant number of Pakistani citizens have migrated from East Bengal and live in West Pakistan or East Pakistan prior to 1971. Bengali was recognised as the second official language of Pakistan on 29 February 1956, and article 214(1) of the constitution of Pakistan was reworded to "The state language of Pakistan shall be Urdu and Bengali". Others include illegal immigrants who migrated from Bangladesh after 1971. Most Pakistani Bengalis are bilingual speaking both Urdu and Bengali, and are mainly settled in Karachi.

Foreign languages 
 some Pakistanis are learning Chinese to do business with companies from the People's Republic of China.

Classification

Indo-Iranian 
Most of the languages of Pakistan belong to the Indo-Iranian branch of the Indo-European language family. The common ancestor of all of the languages in this family is called Proto-Indo-Iranian—also known as Common Aryan—which was spoken in approximately the late 3rd millennium BC. The three branches of the modern Indo-Iranian languages are Indo-Aryan, Iranian, and Nuristani. A fourth independent branch, Dardic, was previously posited, but recent scholarship in general places Dardic languages as archaic members of the Indo-Aryan branch.

Indo-Aryan 
Majority of the languages spoken in eastern regions of Pakistan belong to the Indo-Aryan group. 

Modern Indo-Aryan languages descend from Old Indo-Aryan languages such as early Vedic Sanskrit, through Middle Indo-Aryan languages (or Prakrits).

Some of the important languages in this family are dialect continuums. One of these is Lahnda, and includes Saraiki (spoken mostly in southern Pakistani Punjab by about 26 million people), the diverse varieties of Hindko (with almost five million speakers in north-western Punjab and neighbouring regions of Khyber Pakhtunkhwa, especially Hazara), Pahari/Pothwari (3.5 million speakers in north-central Punjab, Azad Kashmir and parts of Indian Jammu and Kashmir), Khetrani (20,000 speakers in Balochistan), and Inku (a possibly extinct language of Afghanistan).

Iranian 
Majority of the languages spoken in western regions of Pakistan belong to the Iranic group. There are several dialects continuums in this family as well: Balochi, which includes Eastern, Western and Southern Balochi; and Pashto, and includes Northern, Central, and Southern Pashto.

Other 
The following three languages of Pakistan are not part of the Indo-European language family:

 Brahui (spoken in central Balochistan province) is a Dravidian language. Its vocabulary has been significantly influenced by Balochi. It is an individual language in the Dravidian language family and does not belong to any subgrouping in that language family. 
 The Balti dialect of Ladakhi (spoken in an area of southern Gilgit–Baltistan) is a Tibetan language of the Tibeto-Burman language family.
 Burushaski (spoken in Hunza, Nagar, Yasin, and Ishkoman valleys in Gilgit–Baltistan) is a language isolate with no indigenous written script and instead currently uses Urdu script, based on the Perso-Arabic script.

Writing systems 

Most languages of Pakistan are written in the Perso-Arabic script. The Mughal Empire adopted Persian as the court language during their rule over South Asia as did their predecessors, such as the Ghaznavids. During this time, the Nastaʿlīq style of the Perso-Arabic script came into widespread use in South Asia, and the influence remains to this day. In Pakistan, almost everything in Urdu is written in the script, concentrating the greater part of Nastaʿlīq usage in the world.

The Urdu alphabet is a right-to-left alphabet. It is a modification of the Persian alphabet, which is itself a derivative of the Arabic alphabet. With 38 letters, the Urdu alphabet is typically written in the calligraphic Nasta'liq script.

Sindhi adopted a variant of the Persian alphabet as well, in the 19th century. The script is used in Pakistan today, albeit unlike most other native languages of Pakistan, the Naskh style is more common for Sindhi writing than the Nasta'liq style. It has a total of 52 letters, augmenting the Urdu with digraphs and eighteen new letters for sounds particular to Sindhi and other Indo-Aryan languages. Some letters that are distinguished in Arabic or Persian are homophones in Sindhi.

Balochi and Pashto are written in Perso-Arabic script. The Shahmukhī script, a variant of the Urdu alphabet, is used to write the Punjabi language in Pakistan.

Usually, bare transliterations of Urdu into Roman letters, Roman Urdu, omit many phonemic elements that have no equivalent in English or other languages commonly written in the Latin script. The National Language Authority of Pakistan has developed a number of systems with specific notations to signify non-English sounds, but these can only be properly read by someone already familiar with Urdu.

Maps 
This is a series of maps which shows the distribution of different languages in Pakistan as of the 2017 Pakistan Census. These all refer to the mother tongues of individuals only.

See also 
 Demographics of Pakistan
 Ethnic groups in Pakistan
 Pakistani People
 Romanisation of Urdu
 National Language Promotion Department

Notes

References

Bibliography 

Rahman, Tariq (1996) Language and Politics of Pakistan Karachi: Oxford University Press. New Delhi: Orient Blackswan, 2007.
Rahman, Tariq (2002) Language, Ideology and Power: Language-learning among the Muslims of Pakistan and North India Karachi: Oxford University Press. Rev.ed. New Delhi: Orient Blackswan, 2008.
Rahman, Tariq (2011) From Hindi to Urdu: A Social and Political History Karachi: Oxford University Press.
 (access limited).

External links 
 Linguistic map of Pakistan at Muturzikin.com
 Pakistan census statistics by population
 List of Pakistani Languages at Ethnologue